Chlamydera is a genus of bird in the family Ptilonorhynchidae.

Species
All species found in Australia and/or New Guinea:
 Fawn-breasted bowerbird (Chlamydera cerviniventris)
 Western bowerbird (Chlamydera guttata)
 Great bowerbird (Chlamydera nuchalis)
 Yellow-breasted bowerbird (Chlamydera lauterbachi)
 Spotted bowerbird (Chlamydera maculata)

 
Bird genera
Taxonomy articles created by Polbot